Jeremy Clarke (born 5 February 1962) is a British-born poet.

Career
Clarke's debut collection, Devon Hymns (2010), featured artwork by John Berger and Yves Berger. A limited edition chapbook, Incidents of Travel, and Common Prayer (pamphlet) were published in 2012. His second full collection, Spatiamentum, was published in 2014 (illustrations by Italian artist Paola Volpato). All titles were published by Rufus Books, Toronto. An illustrated booklet, Cathedral, was privately printed in 2017.  A third collection, Psalms in the Vulgar Tongue, was published by Wounded Wolf Press (Ankara, Turkey) in 2018. Bread of Broken Ground was privately printed in 2020.

Clarke has collaborated with British sculptor Emily Young on a work in stone for St Pancras Old Church in London.  The stone, a polished block of Carrera marble, is inscribed with an extract from Clarke's poem Praise.  It reads: 'And I am here / in a place beyond desire / or fear'. It was unveiled in 2009.

Clarke participated in the exhibition Works On Paper (Crypt Gallery, London, 1–14 September 2014), showing 20 framed psalms (taken from his collection Psalms in the Vulgar Tongue). Each piece is a handwritten manuscript in brown ink on stained wood with original poem.

In 2016, a 'psalm card' artwork was permanently installed in the Church of St Anselm and St Cecilia, Lincoln's Inn Fields, London.

Also in 2016 a series of artworks was created under the title Host. Each one is an original text printed on a large watercolour sheet left for one winter on a London rooftop. They are held in both public and private collections.

In 2018 a very large book, Fallen, was produced by Walter Newbury Ltd, London.  Arranged in four sections, the book contains 16 poems (from Psalms in the Vulgar Tongue) and 20 original artworks by Clarke (watercolour sheets marked purely by a season's weather).  Housed in a strapped box, it measures 70 x 90 cm and weighs 30 kg.  Made entirely by hand, it is the largest book ever made by the company.  The item permanently resides at Eton College Library (Modern Collections).

Also in 2018, a framed psalm artwork was permanently installed at Notre Dame de France, Leicester Square, London.

In 2020, Stations, an artwork interpreting the Stations of the Cross in six clear cast acrylic blocks was completed. It was first exhibited at Notre Dame de France.

In John Berger's novel From A to X (2008) Clarke appears as the character Hasan, a street sweeper and poet, living alone in a spare, unfurnished room.

Clarke's long poem Music for Amen appeared in the anthology The Long White Thread of Words: Poems for John Berger (Smokestack Books, 2016).

A collected work, Stone Hours, will appear in 2024.

Clarke is currently a Poet in Residence at Eton College.

References

External links
Interview with Jeremy Clarke in The Church Times, 11/03/11
Interview with Jeremy Clarke in The Literateur magazine, 28/10/10
Recordings of Jeremy Clarke reading his own works

1962 births
Living people
British poets
British male poets